Eudy is both a given name and a surname. Notable people with the name include:

Eudy Simelane (1977–2008), South African footballer and activist
Sid Eudy (born 1960), American professional wrestler and actor